The lyceum is a category of educational institution defined within the education system of many countries, mainly in Europe. The definition varies among countries; usually it is a type of secondary school. Generally in that type of school the things that are taught are basic science and also in some part of that type of schools, some introduction to specific kind of jobs also may be done.

History
Lyceum is a Latin rendering of the Ancient Greek , the name of a gymnasium in Classical Athens dedicated to Apollo Lyceus. This original lyceum is remembered as the location of the peripatetic school of Aristotle.

The name lycée was retrieved and utilized by Napoleon in 1802 to name the main secondary education establishments. From France the name spread in many countries influenced by French culture.

By country

Asia

India
The Goa Lyceum in Panaji, Goa – established in 1854, following the Portuguese model – was the first public secondary school in the state, then a Portuguese territory.

Philippines
The Philippines follows its version of the K-12 system, where the term junior high school might be used instead of lyceum. However, there are schools that appropriate the word lyceum in their name. The Lyceum of the Philippines University (LPU) is a university in Manila established by former wartime president José P. Laurel. Among its notable alumni are current president Rodrigo Duterte, popular author Rene Villanueva, and actor Cesar Montano. LPU has campuses in Makati, Batangas, Laguna, Cavite, and Davao. 

Uzbekistan and Tajikistan
Lyceums also emerged in the former Soviet Union countries after they became independent. One typical example is Uzbekistan, where all high schools were replaced with lyceums ( is the Russian term, derived from French ), offering a three-year educational program with a certain major in a certain direction. Unlike Turkey, Uzbek lyceums do not hold university entrance examinations, which gives students the right to enter a university, but they hold a kind of mock examination which is designed to test their eligibility for a certain university.

Europe

Albania
The Albanian National Lyceum was a high school in the city of Korçë, Albania, that emphasized French culture and European values. The school fully functioned with a French cultural emphasis from 1917 to 1939. The school was continued post World War II as the Raqi Qirinxhi High School.

Belarus
The Belarusian Humanities Lyceum is a private secondary school founded shortly after Belarus' independence from the USSR by intellectuals, such as Vincuk Viacorka and Uladzimir Kolas, with the stated aims of preserving and promoting native Belarusian culture, and raising a new Belarusian elite. It was shut down in 2003 by the Ministry of Education of Belarus allegedly for promoting enmity within Belarusian society and using the classroom as a political soapbox, indoctrinating students with biased views on history, ideology, politics, morality and values. The lyceum eventually switched to homeschooling with a limited number of underground homeschoolers.

Czech Republic
The term lyceum refers to a type of secondary education consisting of anywhere from four years ended by graduation. It is a type of schooling between grammar school and a technical high school. For example, the famous scientist Gerty Cori went to a lyceum school.

Finland

The concept and name  (in Swedish,  in Finnish) entered Finland through Sweden. Traditionally,  were schools to prepare students to enter universities, as opposed to the typical, more general education. Some old schools continue to use the name lyceum, though their operations today vary. For example, Helsinki Normal Lyceum educates students in grades 7–12, while Oulu Lyceum enrolls students only in grades 10–12.

France
The French word for an upper secondary school, derives from Lyceum. (see Secondary education in France.)

Germany

The lyceum in Germany was known as an old term for a Gymnasium for girls. In Bavaria it was also a Hochschule to study theology and philosophy.

Greece

In Greece, Λύκειο refers to a type of upper secondary education school for students aged 15 to 18 or 20. The lyceum school first grade admitted students can have a maximum age up to 20 years old. Evening lyceum is both for adult and underage working students, and lasts three years as of the 2020–2021 academic year, per Law 4547/2018.

Upper secondary school (lyceum) 
  (special lyceum) 
  (model lyceum; 2015–present)
  (musical lyceum; 3 years, 1998–present)
  (art lyceum; 3 years, 2003–present)
  (experimental lyceum; 3 years, 2015–present)
  (general lyceum; 3 years, 1976–1996, 2006–present)
  (vocational lyceum; EPAL; 3 years, 2006–present)
  (evening general lyceum; 3 years, 1976–present)
  (evening vocational lyceum; 3 years)
  (integrated special vocational gymnasium-lyceum)
  (ΓΕΕΛ; ; ecclesiastical general lyceum; 3 years, 2006–present)

Defunct upper secondary school (lyceum) 
  (athletic lyceum; 3 years)
  (integrated lyceum; 3 years, 1997–2006)
  (technical lyceum; 3 years, 1977–1985)
  (vocational lyceum; 3 years; Law 576/1977; 1977–1985)
  (gymnasium; integrated 3-year lower and 3-year upper secondary school)
  (integrated multifarious lyceum; 3 years, 1985–1997)
  (technical vocational lyceum; 3 years, 1985–1998)
  (technical vocational training centre; 3 years, 1998–2006)

Hungary
Before World War I, secondary education institutes with a primary goal of preparing for higher studies were often referred to by the word .

Italy
The lyceum is considered by most the hardest and most prestigious kind of secondary school in Italy.

The term liceo refers to a number of upper secondary school, which last five years (from 14 to 19 years of age) and are specialized in teaching philosophy, ancient Greek (in the sole ) and Latin, but also maths, physics, trigonometry, biology and chemistry. It gives preparation for university.
It is divided into five different branches, each one specialized in certain subjects:
 Liceo classico (classical lyceum) is the most various between them but is known for focusing on history, ancient Greek and Latin.
 Liceo scientifico (scientific lyceum) focuses on maths, physics, biology and chemistry.
  (linguistic lyceum) focuses almost entirely on a certain number of languages. Each school can decide which language to teach, but Italian and English are always present.
  (arts lyceum) focuses on arts history and practical arts (varying from drawing to painting to sculpturing)
  (lyceum of human sciences) focuses on human sciences such as psychology, anthropology, sociology and pedagogy. 
Maths and natural sciences are also present.
  (music lyceum) focuses on musical performance.

Latvia
The first Lyceum in Riga was founded in 1675 by the king Charles XI of Sweden (in Latin), and was renamed to the Imperial Lyceum of Riga (in German) in 1733. In September 1921, the Riga French Lycée, an upper secondary school supported by the Government of France was founded in Riga.
In 1989, during the Latvian National Awakening, the Pushkin Lyceum of Riga with education programs in Russian was established. 
In 2002, another Russian lyceum was established in Daugavpils, renamed to Daugavpils High School of Technologies in 2020.

Lithuania
Some gymnasiums are called , e.g. Vilnius Lyceum.

Malta
Junior lyceums refer to secondary education state owned schools.

Republic of Moldova
Until recently, in the Republic of Moldova the lyceum – called  – was an educational institution where students studied from the first to the twelfth grade and would obtain the baccalaureate degree upon completion. In most cases, the lyceums were specialized in a particular domain (fine art, theatre, language) that was relevant to the personality whose name the institution bore. In other respects, it was little different from any regular school, with the exception of slightly higher education standards and supposedly being more prestigious. 
After 2010, regular schools were all formally reformed into lyceums, although their quality remained of the same level as before and most did not get any particular specialization, thereby being dubbed 'theory lyceums'. One reason for the 2010 reform was to reduce the influence of the Soviet/Russian educational system and/or mentality in Moldova.

Netherlands
In the Netherlands, a lyceum is a selective secondary school for children aged 12–18 that offers "voorbereidend wetenschappelijk onderwijs" (vwo) and "hoger algemeen voortgezet onderwijs" (havo), the top and high levels of secondary education available in that country. Successful completion allows vwo students admission to university and havo students to hogeschool, comparable to vocational university. The term lyceum is also sometimes used for other vocational schools such as the Grafisch Lyceum, or Muzieklyceum Amsterdam, which grew into the Conservatorium van Amsterdam.

Poland

The  is the Polish secondary-education school. Polish liceums are attended by students aged 15 to 19–20 (see list below). Before graduating, pupils are subject to a final examination, the matura.

Polish liceums are of several types:
general lyceum (15–19)
specialised lyceum (15–19)
 complementary lyceum (17-20)

Portugal
From 1836 until 1978, in the Portuguese educational system, the lyceum, or national lyceum, was a high school that prepared students to enter universities or more general education. On the other hand, the technical school was a technical-oriented school.

After several education reforms, all these schools merged into a single system of "3rd cycle basic" and secondary schools, offering grades 7 to 12.

Romania
It represents a post-secondary form of education. In order for a student to graduate the lyceum and obtain a baccalaureate diploma, they must pass the bac. The lyceum consists of four school years (ages 15–19). Although the lyceum is a pre-university educational institution, it can be enough for the graduates to find a job, mainly in office work.

Russia
In Imperial Russia, a lyceum was one of the following higher educational facilities: Demidov Lyceum of Law in Yaroslavl (1803), Alexander Lyceum in Tsarskoye Selo (1810), Richelieu Lyceum in Odessa (1817), and Imperial Katkov Lyceum in Moscow (1867).

The Tsarskoye Selo Lyceum was opened on October 19, 1811, in the neoclassical building designed by Vasily Stasov and situated next to the Catherine Palace. The first graduates included Aleksandr Pushkin and Alexander Gorchakov. The opening date was celebrated each year with carousals and revels, and Pushkin composed new verses for each of those occasions. In January 1844 the Lyceum was moved to Saint Petersburg.

During 33 years of the Tsarskoye Selo Lyceum's existence, there were 286 graduates. The most famous of these were Anton Delwig, Wilhelm Küchelbecher, Nicholas de Giers, Dmitry Tolstoy, Yakov Karlovich Grot, Nikolay Yakovlevich Danilevsky, Alexei Lobanov-Rostovsky and Mikhail Saltykov-Shchedrin.

Since the 1990s there are lyceums (special secondary schools) with in-depth study of humanitarian or natural science disciplines. As a rule, university professors teach in lyceums, and the educational system resembles that of a university. Later, the lyceums were renamed special general secondary schools.

Serbia
The Lyceum of the Principality of Serbia was the first higher education school in Serbia in which education was taught in Serbian. It was founded in 1838 on the initiative of Prince Miloš Obrenović in 1838 in Kragujevac, then the capital of Serbia. When Belgrade became the Serbian capital in 1841, the Serbian Lyceum opened there. In 1863 it became known as the Grandes écoles until 1905 when it officially changed its name to the University of Belgrade.

Turkey
It lasts four to five years with respect to the type of the high school. At the end of their  education, students take the TYT/AYT test, i.e. university entrance examination, to get the right to enroll in a public university or a private university.

Ukraine
According to the Law of Ukraine "On Education", the lyceum is a level III secondary institution of education (or a structural unit of another institution of education) that provides field-specific secondary education. As it is planned, since 2017 a three-year senior school will be a lyceum of academic or vocational training. In vocational school, a student will master his/her first profession, whereas in an academic lyceum he/she will deepen personal knowledge of specific subjects that will be studied further at a higher education establishment. Graduates of academic lyceums will be able to obtain a bachelor's degree in three years (in most specialties) instead of four.

Other types of lyceums in Ukraine include military lyceums and lyceums with intensive military and physical training.

North America

United States
See lyceum movement and comparison of US and UK secondary school years (except Scotland).

South America

Chile
It is not uncommon in Chile to use the word  when referring to a high school.

Uruguay
 is commonly used to refer to secondary education. It was adopted from the French immigrants of the 19th century.

See also
Comparison of US and UK Education
Lyceum (classical)
Educational stage

Notes

References

External links
Polish System of Education
 Lyceum college of medicine international students www.lyceumnorthwesternuniversity.com

School types

Education in Europe by country
Education by continent

es:Liceo